The Nso people are from the Bamenda grass fields Northwest Region of Cameroon. Their traditional language is Lamnso (language of Nso) and their capital is Kumbo – where the Palace of the Fon is found.

Summary History 
The Nso’ people migrated from Tikari in the Adamawa Region of Cameroon when there was a bloody succession after the death of Chief Tinki in 1387. The enthronement of Mveing as successor of Tinki sent all rivals to the throne away from Kimi. Ngonnso’, the founder of the Nso’ dynasty, left Kimi with a few followers together with her brothers Nchare Yen and Mbombam and their respective followers. After parting company with her brothers, Ngonnso’ and her followers first settled in Mbo’nso’, then later to Ndzennso’, Kovifem, Taavisa (for security), back to Koovifem, then to Kimbo (Kumbo). The tribe got its name from Ngonnso’, and is one of the largest tribes of Cameroon.

Government

Pre-colonial period

The Fon is the traditional ruler. He is both the head of the traditional government and the chief religious authority in charge of keeping the ancestors happy. The Fon is supported in his duties by the seven notables called Vibais. These Vibais are Shufais, whose positions are determined by rather intricate history. These include Shufai Ndzendzev, Tahnkum, Doh, Ruun, Tsenlah, Lun and Yuwar. Over the years other Shufais have been appointed by the Fon of Nso without any major political influence, but for the fact that they get a seat at the lower ends of the seating ranks in the palace. His power is kept in check by regulatory groups such as the "Ngwerong" (also "Nwerong") which is in effect the security arm of the government and enforces decisions taken by the Fon. The Nwerong is solely responsible for enthronement of a new Fon. It is also responsible for replacing Fais and Shufais after the death of the incumbent. Members of the royal families (except the Fons) may not become members of the Nwerong. The "Ngiri" resembles the Nwerong, but is only for princes. New Fons are selected from a group of eligible princes by a system kept secret from those eligible, thus eliminating a possible source of corruption.

The princes are called Wontho and regularly meet in the presence of the Fon to discuss family matters. There are other Fons that generally act as advisers to the Fon of Nso. The existence of these Fons today signifies an evolution in the history of the Nso people. Most of them were once leaders of independent tribes that through warfare or peaceful negotiations, or through share events of history, came to subordinate the Fon of Nso. They are the only ones (along with foreign Fons) that are allowed to bring in their own seats (Kavahs) to the Nso Palace. These, inexhaustively, include the Fons of Oku, Mbiami, Nseh, Nkar, Gwan, Kiluun, Ngashong, Nshokov, Gwarkang, Taabah, etc. The Fons of Oku and Mbiami were once princes of Nso. All the Fons of Nso and Shufai Ndzendzev are members of both the Nwerong and the Ngiri. 

The Nso society is divided into groups according to lineage. Each lineage group is led by a "Fai".  Tradition dictates that the hand of a Fai is not to be shaken. Fais can be recognized by their glass bead necklaces and fancy walking sticks. A Fai is instituted by a Fon. Other leaders are called Sheys, and are a level below the Fais.

Colonial period
As a result of the Berlin Conference Cameroon became part of the German Empire in 1884 The German Explorer Dr Eugen Zintgraff made the first European contact with the Bafut in April 1889  Account of the first contact between the Nso and the German is distilled from oral retellings of the Nso elders and German reports, which are currently housed at the National Archives in Yaounde. The first contact involved eight to ten Europeans of the expeditionary force of Lt Col Von Pavel in January 1901 – 1902. They marched from Babungo and on January 12 the camped at Sov where they received a gift of a ram from the Fon. It was noted by Lt Von Pavel that the first contact with the Nso people of Bansso was friendly. According to oral tradition it was suspected that the reason for later hostilities against the Nso by German forces is based on a long-standing practice by the Nso warriors that involved keeping the skulls of their defeated war enemies as trophies. When the Germans were invited in the Nso manjong, warrior lodge, they saw many skulls hanging on rails and assumed that the Nso people were cannibals. It was archived that the hostilities began between October–March with the arrival of a new expedition that was well armed. It was reported that this new group severely beat a man and left him for dead, and also hit a lineage elderly with the butt of a gun. These aggressive actions prompted a retaliation by the Nso who attacked the expedition camp with about 1200 men. Having been warned of the planned attacked, they burnt down the palace and moved the camp.

The early contact between Nso and the Europeans was marked by a succession of revolt and resistance that were ultimately all defeated by the Europeans. Once the defeated Nso surrendered to the Germans, part of the terms were to supply indigenous labor for coastal work and to build roads for their new government elites. A new system of taxation, administration, and labor was imposed upon the Nso people by the imperialists, first the Germans and then the British.

The colonial tax system undermined the Fon in his sub-chiefdoms by the institution of Indirect rule. Traditionally, the sub-chiefdoms paid tribute directly to the fon, but with the new system they would collect taxes and keep a portion of the tax commission then turn it over to the Fon who collected it for the colonial administration. The Fon would also retain a commission, thus turning a former kingship headed by the Fon and a council into a figurehead that answered to the Crown. These policies, outlined by European imperialists, were enforced by regional fons. Oftentimes a fon lost the high approval of his people, but maintained a favorable standing with the Europeans—provided he maintain their mandates.

Modern government

Following liberation in 1960, the francophone Cameroon joined with anglophone Cameroon to form their current republic. Seeing the fallacies and difficulties of the colonial state, the fledgling post-colonial government aimed to forge a new, self-reliant state centered around using the state itself as the main source of production. On the surface it may appear that the hybrid of parliamentary-style government and the traditional fon structure was done to pay homage to the foundation upon which the current republic is forged, but it was done to implement a new type of indirect rule. While there are three classifications of chiefs, each class serves as a function of the larger state and turning fons into clients. This keeps the local people happy by maintaining their traditional systems while at the same time undermining the fon by not giving him true autonomy. With the changing of legislation, any fon can be held in contempt or detained for failure to comply.

The present Fon is Sehm Mbinglo I.

Gender roles
Women's tasks in the precolonial period included producing both crops and children. This has been a linchpin of the male power and status in the whole of Africa. This phenomenon is deeply analyzed in Miriam Goheen's 1997 ethnography, Men Own the Fields, Women Own the Crops: Gender and Power in the Cameroon Grasslands. The book discusses the struggle over power that existed in the Nso chiefdom and the colonial // post-colonial state amongst the sexes through a socio-historic lens for deeper analysis.

Pre-colonial era
In pre-colonial Nso culture the division of labor broke down along gender and community lines, whereby, like Goheen's title states, men owned the fields while women owned the crops. The men of each village were given the rights to use the lands upon which their families (primarily the wives) farmed, either by the fon or inheritance. The crops harvested from them were sold by the women in the marketplaces and the spoils of their work were given to the husbands. Despite the fact that the Nso men obviously had taken the lead in the domination of the society that includes at the national level and at the local level, women have been seen to have some things which belong to them solely by the virtue that they are women. This is clearly indicated by the fact that the parcels of land may belong to the men but the women are the ones who control the crop yielding through the input of their labor. They traditionally decided what would happen with the crops after they were harvested and would typically subsistence farm. This is something that would change with the end of the precolonial era. Goheen clearly states that gender is at stake in the complex historical process especially in the tenure systems of land, external, internal politics, and marriage systems. While taking a look at the resistance of women to traditional patterns of marriage Goheen tosses a question on whether this changes the equilibrium of power between two sexes. It also questions whether this resistance may lead to a new class of elites as it is only the better-educated women from families with wealth that can change power and labor dynamics in a household.

Modern gender relations
In Men Own the Fields, Women Own the Crops, Miriam Goheen elaborated on the gender inequality in Nso community. This gender inequality is established by the ideology of hegemony among the Nso people. According to Gramsci, "hegemony is the ways in which a governing power wins consent from those it subjugates; it is carried in cultural, political, and economic forms, in non-discursive as well as in theoretical utterances" (Goheen 1996:12). Hegemony is a discourse established in the favor of the government or any given society to control their population. Therefore, the government or the leaders establish laws to back up with this ideology. Hence, it generated inequality among the Nso men and Nso women. This gender inequality is defined by the subjectivity of the women to their men regardless that the women are considered the "backbone of the country" (Goheen 1996: 63). The Nso have an agricultural society and most of their food subsistence comes from farming. Nso women are called the "backbone of the country" because they are the farmers. However, these women do not have any power over what they produce on the farms except to feed their husbands and children with the food crops. In addition, these farmer women do not have any power over their farms because these farms could only be allocated to them by their men. Besides, the Nso women think it is their responsibility to take care of the food supplies of their households and they find great pride and strength in doing it. Therefore, in the Nso community, any woman who is not a farmer is marginalized by the society especially, by the women. Moreover, regardless of the women's power as farmers and the "backbone of the country," they are not allowed into the council of the men. This distinction is made because the Nso men considered their women as inadequate to reason. "Women, say the men, should always listen only to the man. They cannot reason correctly because their hearts get in the way" (Goheen 1996:71).  Only men are required to discuss public matters with the chief or other leaders at the council of men.

Religion
Jujus, masked spirits, are an important part of Nso culture. (The word "Juju" can also refer to some type of magic.)  Jujus come out on important occasions. Ngwerong and Ngiri (the prince's society) each have seven jujus, often seen passing by on the way to the death celebration of one of the society members. The passing by of a juju being led by its handlers and followed by children is quite the street performance. Other jujus include groups that dance to drums and xylophones.

Another traditional organization is "Mfu", a warrior society. Each village has its own chapter with its own meeting house where the group gathers every eighth day (the traditional week). It is a place where men in the village can come to hear the latest news and where the village leaders can disseminate information or organize village work. Most Mfu houses are richly decorated with carved posts, both inside and outside.  To enter the Mfu house, one must wear a hat and a cutlass, and one must bring a drinking cup to partake in the drinking of "Melu" (raffia palm wine). Each member of Mfu must take their turn supplying the group with palm wine. When a member has done an adequate job of "celebrating" Mfu, the drums will come out for dancing.

Culture
Nso shares a vast culture. This is usually exhibited during the cultural week festival "Ngam Ngonso".  This festival brings together all the various aspects of tradition and culture shared not only the Nso people but amongst the other tribes around Nso. "Jujus" are seen on display from the palace to other quarters of Kimbo town. It is a good view for visitors and indigenes of Nso.

Studies 
Women of the Grasslands by Phyllis Kaberry

Men Own the Fields, Women Own the Crops by Miriam Goheen

Bernard Fonlon
Cardinal Christian Wiyghan Tumi
Archbishop Paul Verdzekov
Bishop Immanuel Banlanjo Bushu
Jamilatu Adamu Kakara
Ngafin Michael

References

Works cited

External links
 

Ethnic groups in Cameroon